Psi Velorum, Latinized from ψ Velorum, is a binary star system in the southern constellation of Vela. Based upon an annual parallax shift of 53.15 mas as seen from Earth, it is located 61.4 light years from the Sun. It is visible to the naked eye with a combined apparent visual magnitude of +3.58. The motion of this system through space makes it a candidate member of the Castor stellar kinematic group.

The two components of this system orbit their common barycenter with a period of 33.95 years and an eccentricity of 0.433. The semimajor axis of their orbit has an angular size of 0.862 arc seconds. The primary, component A, is a yellow-white hued F-type subgiant with an apparent magnitude of +3.91 and a stellar classification of F0 IV. The fainter secondary, component B, is also an F-type subgiant of magnitude +5.12 and class F3 IV. It has been reported to be variable between magnitude 4.5 and 5.1.

References

F-type subgiants
Suspected variables
Binary stars

Vela (constellation)
Velorum, Psi
Durchmusterung objects
0351
082434
046651
3786